Sinapis arvensis, the charlock mustard, field mustard, wild mustard, or charlock, is an annual or winter annual plant of the genus Sinapis in the family Brassicaceae. It is found in the fields of North Africa, Asia and Europe. Pieris rapae, the small white butterfly, and Pieris napi, the green veined white butterfly are significant consumers of charlock during their larval stages.

Description

Sinapis arvensis  reaches on average  of height, but under optimal conditions can exceed one metre. The stems are erect, branched and striated, with coarse spreading hairs especially near the base. The cauline leaves are much reduced and are short petiolate to sessile but not auriculate-clasping. It blooms from May to September, or May to August, in the UK. The inflorescence is a raceme made up of yellow flowers having four petals with spreading sepals. The fruit is a silique 3–5 cm long with a beak 1–2 cm long that is flattened-quadrangular. The valves of the silique are glabrous or rarely bristly, three to five nerved. The seeds are dark red or brown, smooth 1-1.5 mm in diameter.

Phytochemistry
It contains chemicals of the class glucosinolates, including sinalbin. The seeds contain a plant hormone, Gibberellic acid, which effects the dormancy of the seeds.

Taxonomy
It was formally described by the Swedish botanist Carl Linnaeus in his seminal publication 'Species Plantarum' on page 668 in 1753.

It is commonly known as charlock mustard, field mustard, wild mustard, or charlock.

Etymology
The generic name Sinapis derives from the Greek word sinapi meaning 'mustard' and was the old name used by Theophrastus for any mustard. The species name arvensis is a Latin adjective meaning 'from/of the field'.

Distribution
A native of the Mediterranean basin, from temperate regions of North Africa, Europe and parts of Asia. It has also become naturalised throughout much of North America, South America, Australia, Japan and South Africa.

Range
It is found in North Africa, within Algeria, Egypt, Libya, Morocco and Tunisia. Within Asia, it is found in Arabian Peninsula (in Kuwait, Oman, Qatar, Saudi Arabia and the United Arab Emirates), Armenia, Azerbaijan, the Caucasus, China, Georgia, Iran, Iraq, Israel, Jordan, Kazakhstan, Kyrgyzstan, Lebanon, Siberia, Syria, Tajikistan, Turkmenistan and Uzbekistan. It is also found in tropical Pakistan. In eastern Europe, it is found within Belarus, Estonia, Latvia, Lithuania, Moldova and Ukraine. In middle Europe, it is in Austria, Belgium, the Czech Republic, Germany, Hungary, the Netherlands, Poland, Slovakia and Switzerland. In northern Europe, in Denmark, Finland, Ireland, Norway, Sweden and the United Kingdom. In southeastern Europe, within Albania, Bosnia and Herzegovina, Bulgaria, Croatia, Greece, Italy, Montenegro, North Macedonia, Romania, Serbia and Slovenia. Also in southwestern Europe, it is found in France, Portugal and Spain.

Habitat
It grows in the plains and mountains, in pastures, fields, roadsides, waste places (such as railways, tips, and waste ground), and ruins, but mainly in cultivated places.

Ecology
The flowers are pollinated by various bees like Andrena agilissima and flies (entomophily). Sinapis arvensis is the host plant of the caterpillars of some Lepidoptera, such as the small white, Pieris rapae. The seeds are toxic to most animals, except birds,  and can cause gastrointestinal problems, especially if consumed in large quantities.

It is a highly invasive species in states such as California.

Uses
The leaves of wild mustard are edible at the juvenile stage of the plant; they are usually boiled, such as in 18th century, in Dublin, where it was sold in the streets. During the Great Famine of Ireland, wild mustard was a common famine food, even though it often caused stomach upset. Once the seeds are ground, they produce a kind of mustard.

A type of oil can be extracted from the seed which has been used for lubricating machinery.

As ruminant feed 
Grazing wild mustard at growing and flowering stages is harmless for cattle and sheep. Poisoning can occur in the same animals when fed with older seed-wearing plants. This can occur when wild mustard grows as a weed in green-fed rapeseed or cereals. Accidental consumption of wild mustard oil can also the cause of reported intoxications.

See also
Sinapsis alba, known as "yellow mustard" or "white mustard"

References

 Environmental Library of the US Army Corps Engineers
 Conti F., Abbate G., Alessandrini A., Blasi C., 2005. An annotated checklist of the Italian vascular flora, Palombi Editore
 Pignatti S. - Flora d'Italia – Edagricole – 1982. Vol. I, pag. 473

External links

 Arkive
 Plants
 Sinapis arvensis
 Sinapis arvensis Flowers in Israel
 
 
 

Brassicaceae
Plants described in 1753
Taxa named by Carl Linnaeus
Flora of North Africa
Flora of temperate Asia
Flora of Europe